Carole Mathews (born Jean Deifel, also credited as Jeanne Francis; September 13, 1920 – November 6, 2014) was an American film and television actress.

Early years
Born in Montgomery, Illinois, near Chicago, Mathews lived with her grandmother after her parents divorced. She attended elementary schools in Aurora, Illinois, and obtained her secondary education at Calumet High School in Chicago. After graduation from high school, she entered a nunnery in Milwaukee. Her grandmother made her leave it, however, telling her to wait until she was 21.

In 1938, Matthews was named "Miss Chicago" and, in doing so, qualified for a trip to California and a screen test. While in California, she auditioned for the Earl Carroll Follies and won a role in the show for 1939.

Matthews attended the Chicago Conservatory of Music and Drama, where she studied ballet, voice, and drama. She also hosted a WGN radio program, Breakfast Time with Carole Mathews. Soon she was engaged in modeling.

Film 
In 1939, Mathews had some bit parts in films, using the name Jeanne Francis.

Stage
Mathews appeared on Broadway as Karen Jackson in With a Silk Thread (1950).

Filmography

Tender Is the Night (1962) – Mrs. Hoyt
Look In Any Window (1961) – Betty Lowell
13 Fighting Men (1960) – Carole Prescott
Showdown at Boot Hill (1958) – Jill Crane
Million Dollar Manhunt (1957) – Hedy Bergner
Swamp Women (1956) – Lt. Lee Hampton
Betrayed Women (1955) – Kate Morrison
Treasure of Ruby Hills (1955) – Sherry Vernon
Port of Hell (1954) – Julie Povich
City of Bad Men (1953) – Cynthia Castle
Shark River (1953) – Jane Daugherty
Meet Me at the Fair (1952) – Clara [Brink]
Red Snow (1952) – Lieut. Jane
The Man with My Face (1951) – Mary Davies
No Man of Her Own (1950) – Blonde
Cry Murder (1950) – Norma Wayne Alden
Paid in Full (1950) – Model
The Accused (1949) – Waitress
The Great Gatsby (1949) – Ella Cody
Special Agent (1949) – Rose McCreary
Massacre River (1949) – Laura Jordon
Chicago Deadline (1949) – Secretary
Amazon Quest (1949) – Teresa
Sealed Verdict (1948) – Nurse, outspoken WAC
Ten Cents a Dance (1945) – Marge
Sing Me a Song of Texas (1945) – Hilda Cartwright
A Thousand and One Nights (1945) – Handmaiden
Blazing the Western Trail (1945) – Mary Halliday
Outlaws of the Rockies (1945) – Jane Stuart
I Love a Mystery (1945) – Jean Anderson
Over 21 (1945) – Officer candidate's wife
The Monster and the Ape (1945) – Babs Arnold
Tahiti Nights (1944) – Betty Lou
She's a Sweetheart (1944) – Frances
Swing in the Saddle (1944) – Doreen Nesbitt
Girl in the Case (1944) – Sylvia Manners
The Missing Juror (1944) – Marcy
Strange Affair (1944) – Gloria
Together Again (1944) – Girl
Dancing in Manhattan (1944) – Saleslady
Source

Later years

Death 
Mathews, at age 94, died on November 6, 2014.

References

External links

1920 births
2014 deaths
People from Montgomery, Illinois
American film actresses
American television actresses
Actresses from Chicago
People from Reseda, Los Angeles
Businesspeople from California
20th-century American businesspeople
20th-century American businesswomen
21st-century American women